Carolyn Bennett (born May 22, 1962) is a Canadian comedian and writer.

Career
Born and raised in Montreal, Bennett was part of the budding anglophone comedy scene in the 1980s that centred around The Comedy Nest on Bishop Street, operated by Ernie Butler. Bennett's associates and close friends included comedian Sean Keane and the comedy sketch group The Vestibules.

Bennett moved to Toronto in 1986 and performed at Yuk Yuk's while writing for the television show YTV Rocks. In 1989, Bennett moved to Edmonton, Alberta and toured with Yuk Yuk's while working at CFRN/CTV Edmonton as a writer and producer on Video Stew, as well as working as an associate producer on an in-house science magazine show at the public television station ACCESS Network.

After three years in Edmonton, Bennett returned to Toronto to continue doing standup while taking on progressively challenging work as a television writer and performer. She auditioned to be the host of TVOntario's Imprint and was instead given the job by executive producer Stan Lipsey of writing and hosting Blood, Sweat and Tape, a reworking of Ontario's Telefest Awards for young filmmakers and television producers from 1994-1995. She worked for the CBC in the 1990s and 2000s writing and contributed to Canadian Awards show including the Geminis, the Genies and the NHL Awards. She also was briefly a staff writer for This Hour Has 22 Minutes as well as a regular writer for the animated series Ruby Gloom, for which she received a Writers Guild of Canada nomination.  Bennett was a columnist for Eye Weekly in the mid-1990s and had her own standup comedy special on the CBC's Comics!

Most recently, Bennett has been active as a playwright, her work having been produced across Canada and in the United States. In 2013, Bennett received the TIFF Screenwriting Intensive Jury Prize for her screenplay The Mac and Watson Springtime Reeferendum Show. She was a member of the 2017 Thousand Islands Playhouse Playwright's Unit and developed the full-length play The Monarchists

Her debut novel Please Stand By will be published by Vancouver's NON Publishing in Fall 2019.

She continues to perform and co-produces a monthly standup comedy night in Toronto at Hirut Fine Ethiopian Cuisine. Her humour has been described as "warped and wonderful".

She was once a speechwriter for Ontario Premier Dalton McGuinty.

Awards and nominations

Writers Guild of Canada: 2007 finalist for the Canadian Screenwriting Awards - Children & Preeschool for "Yam Ween", an episode of Ruby Gloom

Canadian Comedy Awards: 2012 nominee for Best Performance by a Female - Film

TIFF Studio: June 2013 winner of the Screenwriting Intensive Jury Prize for The Mac and Watson Springtime Reeferendum Show

Personal life

Bennett has often been mistaken for Dr. Carolyn Bennett, a Canadian politician. The two have met on several occasions.

Bennett is also a speaker on substance abuse and recovery.

External links
 Carolyn Bennett Writer/Comic

References

1962 births
Living people
Canadian stand-up comedians
Canadian television personalities
Canadian women dramatists and playwrights
Comedians from Montreal
Television personalities from Montreal
Writers from Montreal
21st-century Canadian dramatists and playwrights
21st-century Canadian women writers
Canadian women television personalities